BBC Radio 1 John Peel Sessions – a collection of I Am Kloot's sessions for John Peel. It was recorded over two sessions at Maida Vale 4: on 18 July 2001 (tracks 1-6) and 5 February 2004 (tracks 7-11; broadcast on 11 March 2004).

It showcases tracks from their first three albums, the song "Titanic" from their first single ("Titanic/To You", double A-side) and "This House Is Haunted", which was previously released as the B-side of the "Life in a Day" single. The song "Coincidence" is included here in the previously unbroadcast version, untitled at the time of recording.

The album was released on Skinny Dog Records, on 30 October 2006.

Track listing 
All songs written by John Harold Arnold Bramwell.

References 

I Am Kloot albums
I Am Kloot
2006 live albums
2006 compilation albums